Francesco Pacini (born 7 January 1995) is an Italian footballer who plays as a goalkeeper.

Biography
Born in Sinalunga, Tuscany, Pacini started his career at Tuscan side Empoli, which he was a player for their youth teams since 2009–10 season. Pacini was a player for Empoli's reserve team from 2012–13  to 2013–14 season, as the second keeper behind Matteo Ricci and Matteo Biggeri respectively. However, he also received call-up from the first team for the decisive match for the promotion to Serie A, as the third keeper, in May 2014. He did not enter the starting lineup as well as the bench.

In 2014, he was signed by Serie D club Poggibonsi. On 10 July 2015 Pacini was signed by Serie B newcomer Novara.

Pacini made his professional and Serie B debut in April 2016.

For the 2019–20 season, he joined Modena.

References

1995 births
Living people
People from Sinalunga
Italian footballers
Association football goalkeepers
Empoli F.C. players
U.S. Poggibonsi players
Novara F.C. players
Trapani Calcio players
S.S. Teramo Calcio players
Modena F.C. players
Serie B players
Serie C players
Sportspeople from the Province of Siena
Footballers from Tuscany